Achille Albacini (April 19, 1841 –1914) was an Italian sculptor.

He was born in Rome. He trained at the Accademia di San Luca. Among his works are:
Rebecca 
Andromache
Tamar in act of covering herself
L'acquaiola Pompeiana
Fioraia
La Primavera

References

1841 births
1914 deaths
19th-century Italian sculptors
Italian male sculptors
20th-century Italian sculptors
20th-century Italian male artists
19th-century Italian male artists